Terry Marsh may refer to:

 Terence Marsh (1931–2018), production designer
 Terry Marsh (boxer) (born 1958), English boxer, from Basildon